The Emden or Embden is a German breed of domestic goose. It is named for the town of Emden in north-westernmost Germany.

History 

The Emden is the oldest goose breed of the area that is now Germany, with origins believed to go back to the thirteenth century. It derives from the traditional large white geese of the East Frisia region of north-western Germany; these had a long curved neck and so were sometimes known as Schwanengans or "swan geese". The modern breed was established in the late nineteenth century.

In 2016 the breeding population in Germany consisted of 238 female and 132 male birds. In 2020 the conservation status of the Emdener was listed in the Rote Liste of the Gesellschaft zur Erhaltung alter und gefährdeter Haustierrassen in its Category II, stark gefährdet ("seriously endangered").

Characteristics 

Use 

The Emdener may be kept for meat or for eggs; the meat is of good quality. Geese may lay some 50–60 eggs per year, with an average weight of about

References

Further reading 

 Batty, Joseph (1996): Domesticated Ducks & Geese: Beech Publishing House. 

Emden Geese
Goose breeds
Goose breeds originating in Germany
Animal breeds on the RBST Watchlist
Animal breeds on the GEH Red List